The fifth season of the CBS crime drama series Hawaii Five-0 premiered on Friday, September 26, 2014, and concluded on May 8, 2015, with a two-hour season finale. The season consisted of 25 episodes.

For the 2014–15 U.S. television season, the fifth season of Hawaii Five-0 ranked 20 with an average of 12.28 million viewers.

Cast and characters
On March 13, 2014, it was announced that Jorge Garcia was promoted to a series regular beginning with the fifth season.

Main cast

 Alex O'Loughlin as Lieutenant Commander Steven "Steve" McGarrett, United States Navy Reserve
 Scott Caan as Detective Sergeant Daniel "Danno" Williams, Honolulu Police Department
 Daniel Dae Kim as Detective Lieutenant Chin Ho Kelly, Honolulu Police Department
 Grace Park as Officer Kono Kalakaua, Honolulu Police Department
 Masi Oka as Dr. Max Bergman, Chief Medical Examiner
 Chi McBride as Captain Lou Grover, Honolulu Police Department
 Jorge Garcia as Jerry Ortega

Recurring

Guest stars

Episodes

Production
On March 13, 2014, CBS renewed Hawaii Five-0 for a fifth season. Filming began on July 8, 2014, with a traditional Hawaiian blessing. and the season premiered on September 26, 2014.

Reception

Ratings

Home video release

References

External links
 
 
 Hawaii Five-0 on TVPolar.com
 List of Hawaii Five-0 episodes at The Futon Critic
 

2014 American television seasons
2015 American television seasons
Hawaii Five-0 (2010 TV series) seasons